A General Office (also known as "administrative office") is an important administrative political organ in the communist party organizations and communist countries (such as China, Laos and Vietnam for instance). Generally speaking, the General Office serves administrative functions for its parent organization, such as filing documents, recording meeting minutes, internal and external communications, scheduling, and agenda preparation. 

In China  the General Office can, occasionally, serve coordination and project management duties, but acts only within the bounds as dictated by their superiors and cannot make executive decisions on its own. The General Office typically reports directly to the head of an organization. General Offices may be created for very specific initiatives. For example, the State Council (government) of China has a Legal Affairs (General) Office, and a Hong Kong and Macau Affairs (General) Office.

Almost all organizations directly under the Central Committee of the Chinese Communist Party have a corresponding General Office.

Examples 
 General Office of the Chinese Communist Party
 General Office of the State Council of the People's Republic of China
 General Office of the Central Military Commission

References

Communist terminology
Chinese Communist Party
Communist Party of Vietnam